The Day and the Hour is a 1963 French war-time drama film directed by René Clément and starring Simone Signoret and Stuart Whitman.

Plot
Set in occupied France in 1944 a French woman finds herself helping a downed American pilot as he searches for a way to leave the country.

Cast
 Simone Signoret as Therese Dutheil
 Stuart Whitman  as Captain Allan Morley
 Geneviève Page as Agathe Dutheil
 Michel Piccoli as Antoine
 Reggie Nalder  as Le gestapiste
 Billy Kearns as Pat Riley
 Marcel Bozzuffi as Inspector Lerat
 Henri Virlogeux  as  Legendre
 Pierre Dux  as Inspector Marboz

References

External links

1963 films
1963 drama films
1960s war drama films
French war drama films
Italian war drama films
1960s French-language films
French black-and-white films
Films about shot-down aviators
Films set in 1944
Films set in Paris
Films directed by René Clément
Films scored by Claude Bolling
1960s French films
1960s Italian films